Grand Geneva Resort Airport,  is a privately owned public use airport located 2 miles (3 km) northeast of the central business district of Lake Geneva, Wisconsin, a city in Walworth County, Wisconsin, United States.

This airport is assigned C02 by the FAA and XES by the IATA but has no designation from the International Civil Aviation Organization.

History 
Grand Geneva Resort was built as the Lake Geneva Playboy Club Hotel in 1968, and the airport was marked on the FAA Sectional Aeronautical Chart as Playboy. Commuter air service was available directly from Chicago O'Hare Airport.

Facilities and aircraft 
Grand Geneva Resort Airport covers an area of 20 acres (8 ha) at an elevation of 835 feet (255 m) above mean sea level. It has one runway: 5/23 is 4,100 by 75 feet (1,250 x 23 m) with an asphalt surface, it has an approved GPS approach.

For the 12-month period ending May 5, 2021, the airport had 150 aircraft operations: 67% general aviation and 33% air taxi. 
In January 2023, there were 4 aircraft based at this airport: 1 single-engine, 1 multi-engine, 1 helicopter and 1 glider.

See also
List of airports in Wisconsin

References

External links 
 

Airports in Wisconsin
Airports in Walworth County, Wisconsin
Lake Geneva, Wisconsin